Cue cards, also known as note cards, are cards with words written on them that help actors and speakers remember what they have to say. They are typically used in television productions where they can be held off-camera and are unseen by the audience. Cue cards are still currently being used on many late night talk shows including The Tonight Show Starring Jimmy Fallon, Late Night with Seth Meyers and Conan as well as variety and sketch comedy shows like Saturday Night Live due to the practice of last minute script changes. Many other TV shows, including game and reality shows, still use cue cards due to their mobility, as a teleprompter only allows the actor or broadcaster to look directly into the camera.

History 

Cue cards were originally used to aid aging actors. One early use was by John Barrymore in the late 1930s.

Cue cards however did not become widespread until 1949 when Barney McNulty a CBS page and former military pilot, was asked to write ailing actor Ed Wynn's script lines on large sheets of paper to help him remember his script. McNulty volunteered for this duty because his training as a pilot taught him to write very quickly and clearly. McNulty soon saw the necessity of this concept and formed the company "Ad-Libs". McNulty continued to be Bob Hope's personal cue card man until he stopped performing. McNulty who died in 2000 at the age of 77 was known in Hollywood as the "Cue-Card King".

Marlon Brando was also a frequent user of cue cards, feeling that this helped bring realism and spontaneity to his performances, instead of giving the impression that he was merely reciting a writer's speech. During production of the film Last Tango in Paris, he had cue cards posted about the set, although director Bernardo Bertolucci declined his request to have lines written on actress Maria Schneider's rear end. Tony Mendez became a minor celebrity for his cue card work on the Late Show with David Letterman.

See also 

 Wally Feresten - cue card handler and supervisor known for his work on Saturday Night Live

References

Television technology
Film and video technology
Television terminology